Marin Nikolov (born 15 November 1901, date of death unknown) was a Bulgarian cyclist. He competed in the team pursuit event at the 1936 Summer Olympics. He also won the 1934 edition of the Tour of Romania and the 1935 edition of the Tour of Bulgaria.

References

External links
 

1901 births
Year of death missing
Bulgarian male cyclists
Olympic cyclists of Bulgaria
Cyclists at the 1936 Summer Olympics
Place of birth missing